The Micro Aviation B22 Bantam is a New Zealand ultralight aircraft, designed and produced by Micro Aviation NZ of Hamilton, New Zealand and later of Mandeville, New Zealand. The aircraft is supplied as a complete ready-to-fly-aircraft.

Design and development
The aircraft complies with the Fédération Aéronautique Internationale microlight rules as well as the United Kingdom BCAR Section "S" regulations. It features a strut-braced high-wing, a two-seats-in-side-by-side configuration enclosed cockpit, fixed tricycle landing gear and a single engine in tractor configuration.

The aircraft is made from bolted-together aluminum tubing, with its flying surfaces covered in Dacron sailcloth. The engine is mounted above the cockpit on the forward end of the main keel tube. Standard engines available are the  Rotax 582 two-stroke and the  Jabiru 2200 four-stroke powerplant.

Operational history
Two Bantams are in use by park rangers in Kruger National Park in South Africa. Total production has exceeded 300 aircraft.

The World Directory of Leisure Aviation reviewed the Bantam and described it as "a simple practical aircraft characterized by its agility, vice-free handling and ease of maintenance."

Variants
B22J
Higher powered version
B22S
 Standard model

Specifications (B22J Bantam)

References

External links

1980s New Zealand ultralight aircraft
Homebuilt aircraft
Single-engined tractor aircraft
New Zealand design